The Vercors Regional Natural Park (French: Parc naturel régional du Vercors) is a protected area of forested mountains in the Rhône-Alpes region of southeastern France.

Geography
Set upon a limestone plateau south of Grenoble, the park extends into the French Western Alps. The plateau's main elevation reaches  while the eastern Alpine mountain ridge tops  with Le Grand Veymont (2341m).

The Vercors area is peppered with caves. During World War II, it served as a safe and defensible position for the French Resistance: Forteresse de la Résistance. The area now contains around three hundred monuments to the Resistance, including a memorial center and the preserved remains of a destroyed village.

In modern times, Vercors has become a popular tourist destination frequented for skiing, hiking and spelunking. Several small communes dot the landscape, supported principally by forestry, shepherding and tourism. The area was officially designated a regional natural park in 1970.

Member communes
The Vercors parklands include the following communes:

Auberives-en-Royans
Autrans
Beaufort-sur-Gervanne
Beauvoir-en-Royans
Bouvante
Chamaloc
Château-Bernard
Châtelus
Châtillon-en-Diois
Chichilianne
Choranche
Clelles
Cognin-les-Gorges
Combovin
Corrençon-en-Vercors
Crest
Die
Échevis
Engins
Gigors-et-Lozeron

Glandage
Grenoble
Gresse-en-Vercors
Izeron
La Chapelle-en-Vercors
La Motte-Fanjas
La Rivière
Lans-en-Vercors
Laval-d'Aix
Le Chaffal
Le Gua
Léoncel
Lus-la-Croix-Haute
Malleval-en-Vercors
Marignac-en-Diois
Méaudre
Miribel-Lanchâtre
Le Monestier-du-Percy
Montaud
Omblèze
Oriol-en-Royans

Percy
Plan-de-Baix
Ponet-et-Saint-Auban
Pont-en-Royans
Presles
Rencurel
Rochechinard
Romans-sur-Isère
Romeyer
Rovon
Saint-Agnan-en-Vercors
Saint-Andéol, Drôme
Saint-Andéol, Isère
Saint-André-en-Royans
Saint-Gervais
Saint-Guillaume
Saint-Jean-en-Royans
Saint-Julien-en-Quint
Saint-Julien-en-Vercors
Saint-Just-de-Claix
Saint-Laurent-en-Royans

Saint-Marcellin
Saint-Martin-de-Clelles
Saint-Martin-en-Vercors
Saint-Martin-le-Colonel
Saint-Michel-les-Portes
Saint-Nazaire-en-Royans
Saint-Nizier-du-Moucherotte
Saint-Paul-lès-Monestier
Saint-Pierre-de-Chérennes
Saint-Romans
Saint-Thomas-en-Royans
Saint-Paul-de-Varces
Sainte-Croix
Sainte-Eulalie-en-Royans
Treschenu-Creyers
Vachères-en-Quint
Vassieux-en-Vercors
Villard-de-Lans
Vinay

Partially affiliated

Claix
Fontaine
Noyarey
Saint-Quentin-sur-Isère
Sassenage
Seyssinet-Pariset
Seyssins
Varces-Allières-et-Risset
Veurey-Voroize

See also
 List of regional natural parks of France
 Maquis du Vercors

References

External links
 Official park website 

Regional natural parks of France
Geography of Drôme
Geography of Isère
Tourist attractions in Drôme
Tourist attractions in Isère
Protected areas established in 1970